The Sunchild First Nation is a Cree First Nation in Alberta, Canada part of Treaty 6, signed on May 25, 1944, under the leadership of Chief Louis Sunchild. The First Nation has one reserve, Sunchild 202. It shares the western border of the O'Chiese First Nation.

As of March 11, 2013, the Sunchild First Nation is led by Chief Jonathan Frencheater and councillors Paul Bigchild, Edgar Bigchild, Clint McHugh, Lisa Daychief and Edwin Frencheater. The Chief and Council oversee approximately 1300 members( 1,209 in 2008 census), with approximately 75% living on the Nation. The community is served by the Sunchild First Nation's administrative office, Sunchild First Nation School, Sunchild health centre, Sunchild convenience store, a community head-start program, volunteer fire department, community corrections and a RCMP remote office.

The Sunchild First Nation is home of the Sunchild Bison Cheerleading team, Canada's first and only First Nation Cheerleading program on a reserve.

References

External links 
Aboriginal Affairs and Northern Development Canada's profile for Sunchild First Nation
Sunchild First Nation School Website
Treaty Six Nations Website

First Nations governments in Alberta
Cree governments